Plumpton is located 45 kilometres west of the Sydney central business district, in the local government area of the City of Blacktown and is part of the Greater Western Sydney region.

History
Following European settlement of Australia in 1788, attempts were made to integrate Indigenous Australians into the European culture. As significant land grants had been made around Prospect, a 'Native Institute' – which came to be known as 'Black's Town' – was built early in the 1820s around the Plumpton area, at the intersection of Rooty Hill Road and Richmond Road. The 'School for Aboriginal Children' was relocated to this institution in 1823, however by 1833 it had been abandoned.

In the short time it existed, 'Black's Town' stamped its name on the road from Prospect to the institution. The railway station was named for the road and the settlement around Blacktown railway station and the whole district became known as Blacktown.

Walter Lamb (1825–1906) established a cannery, fruit preserving works and a coursing (greyhound racing) track on his property Woodstock. The area was initially known as Woodstock, but when a post office was established in 1889, there was confusion over this Woodstock and a railway station on the Blayney-Harden line, also called Woodstock. Coursing in England was conducted at Plumpton, so that name replaced Woodstock.

Geography
Located on the Cumberland Plain, Plumpton is a generally flat suburb and is rectangular in shape, bordered by Jersey Road to the north, the Westlink M7 motorway to the east, Woodstock Avenue to the south and Pringle Road to the west. The suburb is primarily residential, with a small commercial area based on the Plumpton Marketplace shopping complex on the northern edge of the suburb.

Plumpton Park is a large recreational and conservation reserve in the centre of the suburb featuring remnant Cumberland Plain open woodland and a constructed wetland based on a stormwater retention basin.

Commercial area

Plumpton Marketplace is a shopping centre, which is home to a Woolworths supermarket, a Big W discount department store, a medical clinic, banking, fashion, fast food and other retail outlets. Plumpton is located close to the suburb of Mount Druitt which provides many of the services which are not available in Plumpton.

Schools
Plumpton Primary School and Plumpton High School are located adjacent to each other. Plumpton High School is located in an urban area serving a diverse population within a low socio-economic context. There are currently around 1100 students who attend the school, representing over 70 different nationalities and including about 75 Aboriginal students.

Plumpton House, a government operated school for children and teens with behavioural problems is also located nearby. There is one church-operated school in Plumpton; Good Shepherd Primary School.

Transport
Plumpton is readily accessed from the Westlink M7 motorway, which forms the eastern boundary of the suburb. The suburb is also a short distance north of the M4 motorway.

Busways provides regular bus services to Rooty Hill, Mount Druitt, Riverstone and Blacktown railway stations.

Demographics
Couples with dependent children make up two-thirds of the population. 25% were children under the age of 15, significantly higher than the national average, while elderly people were 6% of the population. The median age is 30 years, seven years younger than the national median age.

Plumpton is a multicultural area, with 44.9% of residents born overseas. The most common foreign birthplaces were the Philippines (18.4%), Fiji (5.6%), Pakistan (2.6%) and India (2.5%). 1.7% of inhabitants were reported as being of indigenous origin. The most common responses for religious affiliation in Plumpton were Catholicism (41%), Islam (11%), Anglicanism (10%) and Hinduism (6%), while 6% had no religion.

The occupations of the population were clerical and administrative workers (18%), professionals (15%), technicians and trades workers (14%), machinery operators and drivers (13%) and labourers (13%). 6.1% of the labour force in Plumpton were unemployed, slightly higher than average, while the average household income was slightly higher than the rest of the country.

87% of dwellings in Plumpton were fully detached houses, with the remainder consisting of attached houses such as townhouses and duplexes. There were only six apartments. The median rent was $350 per week (compared with $285 for all of Australia) and more than three-quarters of houses were owner-occupied.

Notable residents
 Steven McRae, Principal Dancer, Royal Ballet London – grew up in Plumpton
 Mathew Ryan – Goalkeeper for Australia national soccer team, and Brighton & Hove Albion F.C. in the English Premier League. He was born, and grew up in Plumpton.

References

Citations

Sources 

 The 2001 City of Blacktown Social Plan

External links 

 Plumpton Marketplace
 Plumpton Rural Fire Brigade

Suburbs of Sydney
City of Blacktown